Duchesneodus is a large brontothere endemic to North America. The skeletal characteristic of the mammal was defined by the dome size that was sexually in two distinct forms. The females had a lower but prominent dome while the males had larger domes.

References

Brontotheres
Eocene odd-toed ungulates
Eocene mammals of North America
Fossil taxa described in 1982